Roelof F. Botha (born 19 September 1973) is a South African actuary, venture capitalist and company director.

Botha is a partner at Sequoia Capital and as of 2022 sits on the boards of MongoDB, Evernote, Bird, Ethos, Natera, Square, Unity, and Xoom. He also worked with AssureRX, FutureAdvisor, Instagram, Mixpanel and Mu Sigma. He previously sat on the board of directors of Meebo and YouTube before they were each acquired by Google, Weebly before they were acquired by Square, and Tumblr before they were acquired by Yahoo!. He previously sat on the boards of Eventbrite, Jawbone, Mahalo, Nimbula, Tokbox, and Whisper.

On Forbes Midas List, an annual ranking of venture capital professionals, he ranked 22nd in 2008, 9th in 2021, and 36th in 2022.

Education and career
Botha was born in Pretoria, South Africa, and at the age of six he moved to Cape Town with his parents. He was raised in Hout Bay, a suburb of Cape Town, and attended Hoërskool Jan van Riebeeck. Botha earned a BSc in Actuarial Science, Economics, and Statistics from the University of Cape Town, graduating in 1996. He worked as a business analyst at McKinsey & Co. in Johannesburg from 1996 through 1998. He then moved to the United States, where he received an MBA from the Stanford University Graduate School of Business.

In 2000, prior to his graduation from Stanford, Botha became director of corporate development for PayPal. He moved on to vice-president of finance and was named CFO in September 2001. PayPal went public in February 2002, and was purchased by eBay in October 2002. Meg Whitman offered Botha the opportunity to stay on as CFO post-acquisition, but he left to join Sequoia Capital in January 2003.

At Sequoia, Botha oversaw the firm's investment in YouTube, Instagram, and Square, among others. He also helped to plan the acquisition of Xoom by PayPal. In 2017, Botha took over lead responsibility for Sequoia's US operations from Jim Goetz. In April 2022, Sequoia announced that, starting in July 2022, Botha would replace Doug Leone as Senior Steward of Sequoia's global brand and operations.

Botha has led or co-led Sequoia's investments in several early and growth stage companies. As of 2022, his active investments include Ethos, Evernote, GenEdit, Landis, mmhmm, Pendulum, Skiff, Temporal Technologies, and The Org.

Family
Botha's father, also named Roelof, is an economist. His uncle was the rock musician Piet Botha. His grandfather was Roelof Frederik "Pik" Botha, a South African politician who served as the country's last foreign minister under the Apartheid government, and the first minister of Mineral and Energy Affairs under Nelson Mandela.

References

External links
Roelof Botha Bio, Sequoia.

1973 births
Living people
Actuaries
Afrikaner people
Alumni of Hoërskool Jan van Riebeeck
PayPal people
People from Pretoria
South African businesspeople
South African investors
South African people of German descent
South African venture capitalists
Stanford Graduate School of Business alumni
University of Cape Town alumni